The 17013/14 Hyderabad Pune Pune Express is an Express train belonging to Indian Railways - South Central Railways zone that runs between Hyderabad Deccan and Pune Junction in India.

It operates as train number 17014 from Hyderabad Deccan to Pune Junction and as train number 17013 in the reverse direction.

Coaches
The 17013/14 Hyderabad Pune Pune Express presently has 1 AC 2 tier, 1 AC 3 tier, 5 Sleeper Class, 6 Unreserved/General & 2 Seating cum Luggage Rake coaches.

As with most train services in India, Coach Composition may be amended at the discretion of Indian Railways depending on demand.

Service

As the average speed of the train is below , as per Indian Railway rules, its fare does not include a Express surcharge.

Routeing

The 17013/14 Hyderabad Pune Pune Express runs via Vikarabad Junction, Bidar, Latur, Daund Junction to Pune Junction.

Route

Traction

As the route is yet to be electrified, a WDM 3A from the Kazipet or Pune shed hauls the train for its entire run.

Timetable

No. 17014 Hyderabad to Pune Pune Express leaves Hyderabad Deccan every Tuesday, Friday & Sunday at 22:45 hrs IST and reaches Pune Junction at 13:15 hrs IST the next day.

No. 17013 Pune to Hyderabad Pune Express leaves Pune Junction every Monday, Wednesday & Saturday at 21:15 hrs IST and reaches Hyderabad Deccan at 11:30 hrs IST the next day.

References

External links

Transport in Hyderabad, India
Transport in Pune
Express trains in India
Rail transport in Maharashtra
Rail transport in Karnataka
Rail transport in Telangana